Chamousset may refer to:

 Claude Humbert Piarron de Chamousset
 Chamousset, a commune of the Savoie département, in France